Cristina Rodríguez may refer to:

 Cristina Rodríguez (journalist) (born 1972), Spanish journalist and writer
 Cristina Rodríguez (noble) (born 1075), daughter of El Cid and Jimena Díaz
 Cristina Rodríguez (stylist) (born 1969), Spanish hairstylist, actress and TV presenter
 Cristina Rodríguez Cabral (born 1959), Uruguayan poet, researcher, and Afro-Uruguayan activist

See also
Cristina Rodrigues (disambiguation)